Golden Rain  may refer to:
 Goldenrain tree (Koelreuteria paniculata), a tree species native to eastern Asia, China and Korea
 Laburnum anagyroides, a species of small tree native to Europe
 a rosemary cultivar
The crystallisation process of lead(II) iodide

See also
 Udan Mas